Norman Smith (20 September 1897 – 1978) was an English footballer who played as a right-back in the Football League for Charlton Athletic and Queens Park Rangers.

References

1897 births
1978 deaths
People from Newburn
Footballers from Tyne and Wear
Footballers from Northumberland
English footballers
Association football fullbacks
Tottenham Hotspur F.C. players
Charlton Athletic F.C. players
Queens Park Rangers F.C. players
Chelsea F.C. players
English Football League players